Fahim is a 2019 French biographical comedy drama film directed by Pierre-François Martin-Laval. It is based on the autobiographical book by Fahim Mohammad, Xavier Parmentier and Sophie Le Callennec. The film stars Assad Ahmed, Gérard Depardieu, Mizanur Rahaman and Isabelle Nanty.

Cast
 Assad Ahmed as Fahim Mohammad
 Gérard Depardieu as Sylvain Charpentier
 Mizanur Rahaman as Nura
 Isabelle Nanty as Mathilde
 Sarah Touffic Othman-Schmitt as Luna
 Victor Herroux as Louis
 Tiago Toubi as Max
 Alexandre Naud as Alex
 Pierre Gommé as Eliot
 Axel Keravec as Dufard
 Didier Flamand as Fressin
 Pierre-François Martin-Laval as Peroni
 Sabrina Uddin as Mahamuda

Release
It had its premiere at the Angoulême Film Festival on August 23, 2019. It was released in France by Wild Bunch Distribution on October 16, 2019.

References

External links
 Fahim on Twitter

 

2019 films
2010s Bengali-language films
2019 comedy-drama films
Bengali-language biographical films
2010s French-language films
French biographical drama films
French comedy-drama films
Films about chess
Films about refugees
Films about illegal immigration to Europe
Films set in Bangladesh
Films set in Dhaka
Films set in India
Films set in Paris
Films set in Marseille
Films set in 2011
Films set in 2012
Films shot in Paris
Comedy-drama films based on actual events
Biographical films about children
Films based on autobiographies
Films directed by Pierre-François Martin-Laval
Wild Bunch (company) films
Films about immigration to France
2010s French films